Ben Chestnut (born 1973/1974) is an American billionaire Internet entrepreneur. He is the co-founder (with Dan Kurzius) and former CEO of Mailchimp, an email marketing company. As of November 2022, his net worth was estimated at US$4.1 billion.

Early life
Ben Chestnut was born and raised in Augusta, Georgia and attended high school in Hephzibah, Georgia. He studied physics at the University of Georgia and industrial design at the Georgia Institute of Technology.

Career
He is the co-founder and former CEO of Rocket Science Group, commonly known as Mailchimp a CRM with 15 million users. In 2016, he was recognized as Ernst & Young's Entrepreneur of the Year. According to Atlanta Business Chronicle, in August 2017, Chestnut was awarded "Most Admired CEO".
In October 2018, Forbes noted that Chestnut was now a billionaire.

Compensatory policies 
Chestnut has focused his company's resources in providing compensatory benefits for employees. Chestnut's motivation for his corporate policy stems from his being raised by his military father who had few economic opportunities.

Risks of social media
In an interview with Forbes Magazine, Chestnut countered arguments that social media would replace the need for email and email marketing.

Personal life
Chestnut is married, with two children, and lives in Atlanta, Georgia.

References

External links 
 

American computer businesspeople
American technology chief executives
American technology company founders
Georgia Tech alumni
American people of Thai descent
Living people
People from Augusta, Georgia
University of Georgia alumni
American billionaires
1970s births